Kimsaqucha (Quechua kimsa three, qucha lake, "three lakes", Hispanicized spelling Quimsacocha) is a mountain in the Andes of Peru, about  high. It is situated in the Apurímac Region, Antabamba Province, Oropesa District, and in the Grau Province, Mamara District.

References

Mountains of Peru
Mountains of Apurímac Region